Free Live! is the first live album by English rock band Free. It was rush-released by Island Records to commemorate the band, who had broken up in April 1971. Possibly because of the publicity caused by their breakup (which had also earned them a successful parting single "My Brother Jake" that same month) the album was a hit, reaching No. 4 in the UK Albums Chart. It fared less well in the US Billboard 200 however, reaching No. 89.

Recording
The album (including the extra tracks) was recorded from gigs played in the UK at both The Locarno, Sunderland (January 1970) and Croydon's Fairfield Halls (September 1970), both places where Free had strong followings. Engineer Andy Johns could only use two tracks from the Sunderland gig ("The Hunter" and "All Right Now"), but used crowd noise from it frequently to create seamless links between tracks. With increased re-mastering technology available it has been possible to make others ready for the CD reissue, along with some alternate takes of tracks recorded at the second of the two Croydon sessions that were recorded.  Many of the tracks on the album are from their debut Tons of Sobs (1968), as that album's rock-oriented ethos and uncomplicated production values made its material ideal for performing live.
Segers'Bold text3073781135879

Track listing
 All tracks written by Andy Fraser & Paul Rodgers unless otherwise stated:

Original tracks
"All Right Now" – 6:24
"I'm a Mover" – 3:46
"Be My Friend" – 5:56
"Fire and Water" – 3:56
"Ride on Pony" – 4:30 ("Ride on a Pony" on the back of the CD reissue, but "Ride on Pony" on the cover of both the original LP and the CD)
"Mr. Big" (Andy Fraser, Simon Kirke, Paul Kossoff, Paul Rodgers) – 6:13
"The Hunter" (Booker T. Jones, C. Wells, Al Jackson Jr., Donald Dunn, Steve Cropper) – 5:29
"Get Where I Belong" – 4:19

With the exception of one song, Get Where I Belong, all performances are versions of album tracks.

Extra tracks
The CD reissue contains tracks not featured on the original 1971 LP release. These include "Woman" and a more rock-based version of "Trouble on Double Time" both of which are from Free (1969), nothing of which was featured on the main album itself. There are also live versions of "Walk in My Shadow" (considerably slower than the version on Tons of Sobs) and "Moonshine", which lasts for over nine minutes. The extra tracks also contain alternate live takes of "All Right Now" and "Mr. Big".

The album closes with an alternative studio version of "Get Where I Belong", which is notable for Rodgers forgetting a line and having to hum a later one in order to regain his correct place.
8610
Extra track listing:

9. "Woman" – 4:32 
10. "Walk in My Shadow" – 4:15 
11. "Moonshine" – 9:08 
12. "Trouble on Double Time" – 3:57 
13. "Mr Big" (Alternative Take) – 5:26 
14. "All Right Now" (Alternative Take) – 4:43 
15. "Get Where I Belong" (Alternative Take) – 4:22

Personnel
 Paul Rodgers – vocals
 Paul Kossoff – guitar
 Andy Fraser – bass guitar. Bass/acoustic guitar/piano on "Get Where I Belong."
 Simon Kirke – drums

Notes

References
 Strong, Martin C. The Great Rock Discography, 6th edition. Edinburgh: Canongate Books 1994, 2002. pp. 392–3.
Sutcliffe, Phil. Notes to Free Live! by Free. Universal Island Records Ltd. 1971, 2002.

External links 
 Free - Free Live! (1971) album review by Matthew Greenwald, credits & releases at AllMusic
 Free - Free Live! (1971) album releases & credits at Discogs
 Free - Free Live! (1971, Remastered 2002 with Bonus Tracks) album to be listened as stream on Spotify

Free (band) albums
Albums produced by Andy Johns
1971 live albums
Island Records live albums